Dichomeris quadrata is a moth in the family Gelechiidae. It was described by Kyu-Tek Park and Margarita Gennadievna Ponomarenko in 1998. It is found in Thailand.

The wingspan is 14.5-15.5 mm. The forewings are light brown, with irregularly scattered dark brown scales. The postmedian line is found at four-fifths of the wing and is edged with yellowish-orange scales outwardly. The outer area is dark brown and there are three short lines of brown scales inwardly. The hindwings are grey.

References

Moths described in 1998
quadrata